Fernando Volio Jiménez  (29 October 1924 – 21 May 1996) was a Costa Rican politician. He was a member of the Inter-American Commission on Human Rights and served as foreign minister for a time. He was President of the Legislative Assembly of Costa Rica twice - 1968–1969 and 1987–1988.

His work on human rights was not entirely without controversy. His anti-communism made him a "tolerable" investigator of abuses under Augusto Pinochet and his report on the matter was criticized as too mild.

References 

1924 births
1996 deaths
Presidents of the Legislative Assembly of Costa Rica
Foreign ministers of Costa Rica